Extended Play: Live at Birdland is a live jazz album by the Dave Holland Quintet that was recorded in 2001 at Birdland jazz club in New York City. It was released in 2003.

Reception
Thom Jurek of Allmusic stated "Shockingly, Extended Play is Dave Holland's first live album for ECM, a label he has been associated with for 30 years! Holland's standing quintet -- featuring trombonist Robin Eubanks, saxophonist Chris Potter, drummer Billy Kilson, and vibes and marimba virtuoso Steve Nelson -- are, according to today's jazz standards, a veteran ensemble. On this Birdland date from 2001, they offer ample evidence as to why they are one of the most highly regarded ensembles in the music today. The material on this double-disc collection is, predictably enough, mostly taken from the band's studio releases. But that's where predictability ends. Virtually everything here is in wonderfully extended form, with only one tune clocking in under ten minutes...  If ever there were a contender for jazz record of the year, for 2003, Extended Play is it."

Track listing 
CD 1
 The Balance (Holland) - 21:02
 High Wire (Potter) - 15:21
 Jugglers Parade (Holland) - 18:27
 Make Believe (Holland) - 6:44
 Free for All (Holland) - 10:18

CD 2
 Claressence (Holland) - 17:22
 Prime Directive (Holland) - 13:00
 Bedouin Trail (Holland) - 12:27
 Metamorphos (Eubanks) - 20:10

Personnel 

Chris Potter - soprano, alto and tenor saxophones
Robin Eubanks - trombone
Steve Nelson - vibraphone and marimba
Billy Kilson - drums
Dave Holland - double-bass

References

External links 
 The official Dave Holland website

Dave Holland live albums
2003 live albums
ECM Records albums